St Pancras railway station, also known as London St Pancras or St Pancras International and officially since 2007 as London St Pancras International, is a central London railway terminus on Euston Road in the London Borough of Camden. It is the terminus for Eurostar services from Belgium, France and the Netherlands to London. It stands between the British Library, the Regent's Canal and London King's Cross railway station, with which it shares a London Underground station, .

The station was constructed by the Midland Railway (MR), which had an extensive rail network across the Midlands and the North of England, but no dedicated line into London. After rail traffic problems following the 1862 International Exhibition, the MR decided to build a connection from Bedford to London with its own terminus. The station was designed by William Henry Barlow and constructed with a single-span iron roof. Following the station's opening on 1 October 1868, the MR constructed the Midland Grand Hotel on the station's façade, which has been widely praised for its architecture and is now a Grade I listed building along with the rest of the station.

The complex underwent an £800 million refurbishment to become the terminal for the Channel Tunnel Rail Link/High-Speed 1/HS1 as part of an urban regeneration plan across East London, which was opened by Queen Elizabeth II in November 2007. A security-sealed terminal area was constructed for Eurostar services to mainland Europe via High Speed 1 and the Channel Tunnel, with platforms for domestic trains to the north and south-east of England. The restored station has 15 platforms, a shopping centre, and a coach facility. London St Pancras International is owned by HS1 Ltd and managed by Network Rail (High Speed), a subsidiary of Network Rail.

Location
St Pancras is at the southern end of the London Borough of Camden on a site orientated north–south, deeper than it is wide. The south is bounded by Euston Road (part of the London Inner Ring Road), and its frontage is the St Pancras Renaissance Hotel, while the west is bounded by Midland Road which separates it from the British Library and the east by Pancras Road which separates it from King's Cross station. The British Library is on the former goods yard site. Euston railway station is around ten minutes' walk along Euston Road.

Behind the hotel, the train shed is elevated 5 m (17 ft) above street level and the area below forms the station undercroft which is where most of the shops and restaurants are located, along with the Eurostar departure lounge. The northern half of the station is mainly bounded to the east by Camley Street, with Camley Street Natural Park across the road. To the north-east is King's Cross Central, formerly known as the Railway Lands, a complex of intersecting railway lines crossed by several roads and the Regent's Canal.

Several London bus routes have stops nearby, including 73, 205 and 390.

Domestic station

Background

The station's name comes from the St. Pancras parish, which originates from the fourth-century Christian boy martyr Pancras of Rome. The station was commissioned by the Midland Railway (MR), who had a network of routes in the Midlands, and in south and west Yorkshire and Lancashire but no route of its own to London. Before 1857 the MR used the lines of the L&NWR for trains into the capital; subsequently, the company's Leicester and Hitchin Railway gave access to London via the Great Northern Railway (GNR).

Samuel Carter was solicitor for the parliamentary bill, which was sanctioned in 1863.

The main economic justification for the MR extension was for the transport of coal and other goods to the capital, which was hindered by a 1s 9d toll on GNR lines. A large goods station was constructed between 1862 and 1865, sited to the west of the King's Cross coal depot between the North London Railway and the Regent's Canal. Although coal and goods were the main motivation for the London extension, the Midland realised the prestige of having a central London passenger terminus and decided it must have a front on Euston Road. The company purchased the eastern section of land on the road's north side owned by Earl Somers.

Construction

The passenger station was designed by William Henry Barlow and constructed on a site that had previously been a slum called Agar Town.

(By contrast the lines to the adjacent King's Cross station tunnel under the Regent's Canal). Initial plans were for a two or three span roof with the void between station and ground level filled with spoil from tunnelling to join the Midland Main Line to the St. Pancras branch. Instead, due to the value of the land in such a location the lower area was used for freight, in particular beer from Burton. As a result, the undercroft was built with columns and girders, maximising space, set out to the same plans as those used for beer warehouses, and with a basic unit of length that of a beer barrel.

The contract for the construction of the station substructure and connecting lines was given to Messrs. Waring, with Barlow's assistant Campion as supervisor. The connection to the Widened Lines (St. Pancras branch) ran below the station's bottom level, in an east-to-west direction.

To avoid the foundations of the roof interfering with the space beneath, and to simplify the design, and minimise cost, it was decided to construct a single span roof, with cross ties for the arch at the station level. The arch was sprung directly from the station level, with no piers. Additional advice on the design of the roof was given to Barlow by Rowland Mason Ordish. The Butterley Company was contracted to construct the arches. The total cost of the 24 rib roof and glazing was over £53,000, of which over half was for the main ribs. The cost of the gable end was a further £8,500.

The single-span overall roof was the largest such structure in the world at the time of its completion. The materials used were wrought iron framework of lattice design, with glass covering the middle half and timber (inside)/slate (outside) covering the outer quarters. The two end screens were glazed in a vertical rectangular grid pattern with decorative timber cladding around the edge and wrought iron finials around the outer edge.

Local services began running to the Metropolitan Railway junction underneath the terminus on 13 July 1868. The station itself opened to the public on 1 October. The first service was an overnight mail train from Leeds.

Early services
St Pancras was built during a period of expansion for the MR, as the major routes to Manchester, Nottingham, Sheffield and Carlisle opened during this time. By 1902, there were 150 trains arriving and leaving the station daily, though this figure was far less than Waterloo or Liverpool Street. GER services were suspended because of World War I and never resumed.

The London, Tilbury and Southend Railway (LTSR) began boat train services from St Pancras from 9 July 1894, following the opening of the Tottenham and Forest Gate Railway. Tilbury Docks then provided a connection to Australia and Scandinavia. Boat trains continued to run from St Pancras until 1963, after which they were moved to Liverpool Street and Fenchurch Street.

Grouping, nationalisation and privatisation

The Railways Act of 1921 forced the merger of the Midland with the London and North Western Railway (L&NWR) into the London, Midland and Scottish Railway (LMS), and the LMS adopted the LNWR's (the "Premier Line") Euston station as its principal London terminus. The Midland Grand Hotel was closed in 1935, and the building was subsequently used as offices for British Railways. During World War II, bombing inflicted damage on the train shed, which was only partially reglazed after the war. On the night of 10–11 May 1941 a bomb fell onto the station floor at platform 3, exploding in the beer vaults underneath. The station was not significantly damaged, but was closed for eight days, with platforms 2–3 remaining closed until June. In 1947 the St. Pancras junction was relaid with prefabricated trackwork, along with associated changes to the signalling system.

On the creation of British Railways (BR) in 1948, St Pancras received a significant investment after neglect by the LMS. Destinations included the London area services to North Woolwich, St Albans and Bedford. Long-distance trains reached Glasgow, Leeds, Nottingham, Sheffield and Manchester, with famous named trains including The Palatine to Manchester, The Thames-Clyde Express to Glasgow, and The Master Cutler to Sheffield (transferred from King's Cross in 1966, which itself had transferred from  eight years earlier).

On 7 October 1957, the signalling at St Pancras was upgraded, replacing the three original boxes with a power box controlling 205 route switches and 33 points over a network of 1,400 relays. From 1960 to 1966, electrification work on the West Coast Main Line between London and Manchester saw a new Midland Pullman from Manchester to St Pancras. These trains and those to Glasgow were withdrawn following the completion of the rebuilding of Euston and the consolidation of these services.

By the 1960s, St Pancras was seen as redundant, and several attempts were made to close it and demolish the hotel (by then known as St Pancras Chambers). These attempts provoked strong and successful opposition, with the campaign led by the later Poet Laureate, John Betjeman. Jane Hughes Fawcett with the Victorian Society was instrumental in its preservation, and was dubbed "the furious Mrs. Fawcett" by British rail officials. Many of the demonstrators had witnessed the demolition of the nearby Euston Arch a few years previously and were strongly opposed to the distinctive architecture of St Pancras suffering the same fate. The station became Grade I listed building in November 1967, preventing any drastic modifications. The plans were scrapped by BR in December 1968, realising that it was more cost-effective to modernise the hotel instead, though they disliked owning it.

In the 1970s, the train shed roof was in danger of collapse, and the newly appointed Director of Environment Bernard Kaukas persuaded the company to invest £3m to save it. In 1978, a Private Eye piece said that British Rail really wanted to demolish St Pancras but were opposed by "a lot of long-haired sentimentalists" and "faceless bureaucrats" and praised the office blocks that replaced the Euston Arch. The station offices in the listed former Midland Grand Hotel building were subsequently refurbished in 1993, including a new roof with 275 tonnes of Westmorland Green slate. 

After the sectorisation of British Rail in 1986, main-line services to the East Midlands were provided by the InterCity sector, with suburban services to St Albans, Luton and Bedford by Network SouthEast. In 1988 the Snow Hill tunnel re-opened resulting in the creation of the Thameslink route and the resultant diversion of the majority of suburban trains to the new route. The station continued to be served by trains running on the Midland mainline to Leicester, Nottingham and Sheffield, together with a few suburban services to Bedford and Luton. These constituted only a few trains an hour and left the station underused.

Following the privatisation of British Rail, the long-distance services from St Pancras were franchised to Midland Mainline, a train operating company owned by National Express, starting on 28 April 1996. The few remaining suburban trains still operating into St Pancras were operated by the Thameslink train operating company, owned by Govia, from 2 March 1997.

A small number of trains to and from Leeds were introduced, mainly because the High-Speed Train sets were maintained there and were already running empty north of Sheffield. During the 2000s major rebuild of the West Coast Main Line, St Pancras again temporarily hosted direct and regular inter-city trains to Manchester, this time via the Hope Valley route (via the Dore South curve) under the title of Project Rio.

International station

Design

The original plan for the Channel Tunnel Rail Link (CTRL) involved a tunnel from south-east of London to an underground terminus in the vicinity of King's Cross. However, a late change of plan, principally driven by the then Secretary of State for the Environment Michael Heseltine's desire for urban regeneration in east London, led to a change of route, with the new line approaching London from the east. This opened the possibility of reusing St Pancras as the terminus, with access via the North London Line, which crosses the throat of the station.

The idea of using the North London line was rejected in 1994 by the transport secretary, John MacGregor, as "difficult to construct and environmentally damaging".

London and Continental Railways (LCR), created at the time of British Rail privatisation, was selected by the government in 1996 to reconstruct St Pancras, build the CTRL, and take over the British share of the Eurostar operation.  LCR had owned St Pancras station since privatisation to allow the station to be redeveloped. Financial difficulties in 1998, and the collapse of Railtrack in 2001, caused some revision of this plan, but LCR retained ownership of the station.

The design and project management of reconstruction was undertaken on behalf of LCR by Rail Link Engineering (RLE), a consortium of Bechtel, Arup, Systra and Halcrow. The original reference design for the station was by Nick Derbyshire, former head of British Rail's in-house architecture team. The master plan of the complex was by Foster and Partners, and the lead architect of the reconstruction was Alistair Lansley, a former colleague of Nick Derbyshire recruited by RLE.

To accommodate 300-metre+ Eurostar trains, and to provide capacity for the existing trains to the Midlands and the new Kent services on the high-speed rail link, the train shed was extended a considerable distance northwards by a new flat-roofed shed. The station was initially planned to have 13 platforms under this extended train shed. East Midlands services would use the western platforms, Eurostar services the middle platforms, and Kent services the eastern platforms. The Eurostar platforms and one of the Midland platforms would extend back into the Barlow train shed. Access to Eurostar for departing passengers would be via a departure suite on the west of the station, and then to the platforms by a bridge above the tracks within the historic train shed. Arriving Eurostar passengers would leave the station by a new concourse at its north end.

This original design was later modified, with access to the Eurostar platforms from below, using the station undercroft and allowing the deletion of the visually intrusive bridge. By dropping the extension of any of the Midland platforms into the train shed, space was freed up to allow wells to be constructed in the station floor, which provided daylight and access to the undercroft.

The reconstruction of the station was recorded in the BBC Television documentary series The Eight Hundred Million Pound Railway Station broadcast as six 30-minute episodes between 13‒28 November 2007.

Rebuilding

By early 2004, the eastern side of the extended train shed was complete, and the Barlow train shed was closed to trains. From 12 April 2004, Midland Mainline trains terminated at an interim station occupying the eastern part of the extension immediately adjacent to the entrance.

As part of the construction of the western side of the new train shed that now began, an underground "box" was constructed to house new platforms for Thameslink, which at this point ran partially under the extended station. In order for this to happen, the existing Thameslink tunnels between Kentish Town and King's Cross Thameslink were closed between 11 September 2004 and 15 May 2005 while the works were carried out. Thameslink services from the north terminated in the same platforms as the Midland Main Line trains, while services from the south terminated at King's Cross Thameslink.

When the lines were re-opened, the new station box was still only a bare concrete shell and could not take passengers. Thameslink trains reverted to their previous route but ran through the station box without stopping. The budget for the Channel Tunnel Rail Link works did not include work on the fitting out of the station, as these works had originally been part of the separate Thameslink 2000 works programme.  Despite lobbying by rail operators who wished to see the station open at the same time as St Pancras International, the Government failed to provide additional funding to allow the fit-out works to be completed immediately following the line blockade. Eventually, on 8 February 2006, Alistair Darling, the Secretary of State for Transport, announced £50 million funding for the fit-out of the station, plus another £10–15 million for the installation of associated signalling and other lineside works.

The fit-out works were designed by Chapman Taylor and Arup (Eurostar) and completed by ISG Interior Plc Contractors collaborating with Bechtel as Project Managers. The client was London and Continental Railways who were advised by Hitachi Consulting.

In 2005, planning consent was granted for a refurbishment of the former Midland Grand Hotel building, with plans to refurbish and extend it as a hotel and apartment block. The newly refurbished hotel opened to guests on 21 March 2011 with a grand opening ceremony on 5 May.

By the middle of 2006, the western side of the train shed extension was completed. The rebuilding cost was in the region of £800 million, up from an initial estimate of £310 million.

Opening
In early November 2007, Eurostar conducted a testing programme in which some 6000 members of the public were involved in passenger check-in, immigration control and departure trials, during which the "passengers" each made three return journeys out of St Pancras to the entrance to the London tunnel. On 4 September 2007, the first test train ran from Paris Gare du Nord to St Pancras. Children's illustrator Quentin Blake was commissioned to provide a huge mural of an "imaginary welcoming committee" as a disguise for one of the remaining ramshackle Stanley Building South immediately opposite the station exit.

St Pancras was officially re-opened as St Pancras International, and the High Speed 1 service was launched on 6 November 2007 by Queen Elizabeth II and Prince Philip, Duke of Edinburgh. Services were extended to Rotterdam and Amsterdam in April 2018.

During an elaborate opening ceremony, actor Timothy West, as Henry Barlow, addressed the audience, which was also entertained by the Royal Philharmonic Orchestra and the singers Lemar and Katherine Jenkins. In a carefully staged set piece, the first Class 395 train and two Class 373 trains arrived through a cloud of dry ice in adjacent platforms within seconds of each other. During the ceremony, Paul Day's large bronze statue The Meeting Place was also unveiled. At a much smaller ceremony on 12 November 2007, the bronze statue of John Betjeman by sculptor Martin Jennings was unveiled by Betjeman's daughter, the author Candida Lycett Green. Public service by Eurostar train via High Speed 1 started on 14 November 2007. In a small ceremony, station staff cut a ribbon leading to the Eurostar platforms. In the same month, services to the East Midlands were transferred to a new franchisee, East Midlands Trains. The low-level Thameslink platforms opened on 9 December 2007, replacing King's Cross Thameslink.

St Pancras has retained a reputation of having one of the most recognisable facades of all the London termini, and known as the "cathedral of the railways". In Britain's 100 Best Railway Stations by Simon Jenkins, the station was one of only ten to be awarded five stars. The station has bilingual signs in French and English, one of the few in England to do so. It was considered Europe's most passenger-friendly railway station in an index created in 2020 by the Consumer Choice Center.

Opening of Canal Tunnels
From December 2018, as part of the Thameslink programme, services from the East Coast Main Line/Great Northern Route, also part of the Govia Thameslink Railway franchise, were linked to the Thameslink route, diverting trains previously terminating at Kings Cross into the Thameslink platforms at St Pancras and then through central London to Sussex and Kent.
This link was made possible by the construction of a pair of single-track tunnels, named the Canal Tunnels. These tunnels start immediately off the St Pancras Thameslink platforms, dive under the Regent's Canal, and join the East Coast Main Line where the North London Line and High Speed 1 pass over the top.

Twinning
In October 2019, St Pancras was twinned with the Gare de Bordeaux Saint-Jean, Bordeaux, France. The association was made in the hope that a high-speed service could connect the two stations and was announced at a ceremony headed by Claude Solard, Director General of SNCF.

Platform layout

St Pancras contains four groups of platforms on two levels, accessed via the main concourse at ground level.  The below-surface group contains through platforms A and B, and the upper level has three groups of terminal platforms: domestic platforms 1–4 and 11–13 on each side of international platforms 5–10.  Platforms A & B serve Thameslink, 1–4 connect to the Midland Main Line, while platforms 5–13 lead to High Speed 1; there is no connection between the two lines, except for a maintenance siding outside the station. There are also a variety of shops and restaurants within the station concourse.

The longer international platforms, used by Eurostar, extend into Barlow's train shed, whilst the other platforms terminate at the southern end of the 2005 extension. The international platforms do not occupy the full width of the Barlow train shed, and sections of the floor area have been opened up to provide natural light to the new ground-level concourse below.  Eurostar's arrival and departure lounges lie below these platforms, adjacent to The Arcade, a concourse fashioned from the original station undercroft which runs along the western length of the Barlow train shed.  The southern end of The Arcade links to the western ticket hall of King's Cross St Pancras tube station.

Access to the East Midlands Railway platforms are via the northern end of The Arcade, while the Thameslink and domestic High Speed platforms are reached via a street-level concourse where the old and new parts of the station meet. The main pedestrian entrance is at the eastern end of this concourse, where a subway enables pedestrians to reach King's Cross station and the northern ticket hall of the tube station.

Domestic services

East Midlands Railway

Since 2019, platforms 1–4 have been the southern terminus for Midland Main Line services operated by East Midlands Railway under the 'EMR InterCity' brand to/from the East Midlands and Yorkshire, including Leicester, Nottingham, Derby, Chesterfield and Sheffield primarily using Class 222 'Meridian' diesel-electric multiple units, with some services operated using Class 180 'Adelante' diesel-hydraulic multiple units. East Midlands Railway also operate semi-fast commuter services to and from Kettering and Corby from platforms 1-4 under the 'EMR Connect' brand using Class 360 electric multiple units.

Previously, East Midlands Railway operated occasional services to Leeds, York and Scarborough. Trains to/from York and Scarborough ceased to operate from 2020 onwards, with services to Leeds being discontinued in spring 2022.

, the Monday-Saturday off-peak timetable sees 6 trains per hour (tph).

 2 tph to Corby
 1 tph to Nottingham (stopping)
 1 tph to Nottingham (semi-fast)
 1 tph to Sheffield (stopping)
 1 tph to Sheffield (semi-fast)

These platforms can also be used by Thameslink trains terminating here. In the regular timetable, a handful of Thameslink services use these platforms on Sunday mornings.

Thameslink

As part of the Thameslink Programme, St Pancras International gained platforms on the Thameslink route, replacing King's Cross Thameslink to the south-east. In line with the former station, the Thameslink platforms are designated A and B.

The Thameslink Programme involves the introduction of 12-car trains across the enlarged Thameslink network. As extending the platforms at King's Cross Thameslink was thought to be impractical (requiring alterations to Clerkenwell No 3 tunnel and the Circle/Hammersmith & City/Metropolitan Underground lines, which would be extremely disruptive and prohibitively expensive), it was decided to build new Thameslink platforms under St Pancras.

The typical off-peak weekday Thameslink service sees 14 trains per hour (tph) in each direction.

 4 tph to Bedford
 2 tph to Luton (stopping)
 4 tph to St Albans City (stopping)
 2 tph to Peterborough
 2 tph to Cambridge
 4 tph to Brighton
 2 tph to Three Bridges
 2 tph to Rainham
 2 tph to Sutton via Wimbledon
 2 tph to Sutton via Mitcham Junction
 2 tph to Horsham

There are additional peak-hour services to Orpington, Welwyn Garden City, Sevenoaks and East Grinstead.

Southeastern

Southeastern runs high-speed Class 395 trains on High Speed 1 to Kent and the South East, to Faversham, Ashford International, Ebbsfleet International and other destinations in Kent.

The first domestic service carrying passengers over High Speed 1 ran on 12 December 2008, to mark one year before regular services were due to begin. This special service, carrying various dignitaries, ran from Ashford International to St Pancras. Starting in June 2009, Southeastern provided a preview service between St Pancras and Ebbsfleet, extending to Ashford International during peak hours. In September, Southeastern extended the peak-time services to Dover and Ramsgate. The full service began on 13 December.

The typical off-peak weekday Southeastern service sees 3 trains per hour (tph).

 1 tph to Ramsgate via Faversham
 1 tph to Ramsgate via Dover Priory
 1 tph to Margate via Canterbury West

In the peak there are additionally services to Maidstone West.

Olympic Javelin service
During the 2012 Summer Olympics in London, St Pancras was the Central London terminus of the Olympic Javelin service, a seven-minute shuttle between Central London and Stratford International station for the London Olympic Park.

International services

Up to 39 Eurostar trains daily depart from St Pancras to and from either Paris Gare du Nord, Bruxelles-Midi/Brussel-Zuid, Amsterdam Centraal and Marne-la-Vallée for Disneyland Resort Paris. Extra services run to Paris on Fridays and Sundays, with a reduced service to Brussels and Amsterdam at weekends. Additional weekend leisure-oriented trains run to the French Alps during the skiing season Some trains call additionally at Lille-Europe with some also running non-stop. Non-stop trains take 2 hours 15 minutes to Paris, and just under 1 hour 50 minutes to Brussels, other trains taking 5 or 10 minutes longer depending on whether they make one or two stops.

St Pancras International is one of four railway stations in the UK with juxtaposed immigration control facilities set up by the French Border Police to clear passengers for entry into France and the rest of the Schengen Area prior to boarding the trains. Passengers do not need any further immigration or passport checks after entering the main departure gates, or at the corresponding gate at the other end on return journeys, as they are cleared by the UK Border Force.

Creative arts

There are several works of art on public display at St Pancras. It was designed by the British artist Paul Day to evoke the romance of travel through the depiction of a couple locked in an amorous embrace. Controversy was caused by Day's 2008 addition of a bronze relief frieze around the plinth, depicting a commuter falling into the path of an Underground train driven by the Grim Reaper. Day revised the frieze before the final version was installed.

On the upper level, above the Arcade concourse, stands a bronze statue of John Betjeman, depicted gazing in apparent wonder at the Barlow roof. A work of the British sculptor Martin Jennings, the statue commemorates Betjeman's successful campaign to save the station from demolition in the 1960s. The -high statue stands on a flat disc of Cumbrian slate inscribed with lines from Betjeman's poem Cornish Cliffs:

There are a number of upright pianos in the main St Pancras concourse that are available for anyone to play. In 2016, Elton John gave an impromptu performance here on a piano he subsequently donated to the station as a gift.

Hotel

In 1865 the Midland Railway Company held a competition for architects to design a hotel to front the station. George Gilbert Scott was persuaded to enter by his friend, Midland director Joseph Lewis, and completed the winning design at home while attending to his son who had fallen ill. Though plans were complete by the end of the year, financial pressure meant construction had to be delayed. Work eventually started in 1868 and the main section of the Midland Grand Hotel opened on 5 May 1873, with the west wing following three years later. The building is primarily brick, but polychromatic, in a style derived from the Italian gothic, and with numerous other architectural influences.  Gilbert Scott reused many of the design details from his earlier work at Kelham Hall designed in 1857 and completed in 1863, but on a much grander scale for St Pancras.

The hotel closed in 1935 and was turned into St Pancras Chambers, a group of offices, with ownership retained by the London, Midland and Scottish Railway (which was created when the Midland amalgamated with other railways). In the late 1980s, British Rail sold off and vacated the premises.

Following the decision to connect St Pancras to the Channel Tunnel Rail Link, plans were made to restore the hotel for its original function. Planning permission was granted in 2005 and funded as part of a £50m Government plan to refurbish the station. The St. Pancras Renaissance London Hotel occupies parts of the original building, including the main public rooms, together with a new bedroom wing on the western side of the Barlow train shed. The upper levels of the original building have been redeveloped as apartments by the Manhattan Loft Corporation. These have been sublet via Airbnb owing to their desirable location. The hotel held its grand opening on 5 May 2011, exactly 138 years after its original opening.

The hotel has been used as setting in several films, including Chaplin (1992), Richard III (1995) and From Hell (2001). It was used for the filming of the Spice Girls' 1996 video, "Wannabe".

Accidents and incidents

On 17 February 1918 a German Gotha aircraft dropped five bombs, one of which destroyed the roof of the station's ornate booking hall and killed 20 people. The station was also bombed in World War II, including a parachute mine damaging the roof on 15–16 October 1940, and a bomb exploding in the beer vaults underneath Platform 3 on 10–11 May 1941.

On 20 July 1959, a locomotive overran a signal and crashed into Dock Junction Signal Box; trains had to be hand-signalled in and out of St Pancras for several days.

Service patterns

Future developments

Competition with Eurostar

In January 2010, the European railway network was opened to liberalisation to allow greater competition. Both Air France-KLM and Deutsche Bahn expressed interest in taking advantage of the new laws to run new services via High Speed 1 to St Pancras.

In December 2009, Deutsche Bahn received permission to run trains through the Channel Tunnel after safety requirements were relaxed.  It had previously expressed a desire to run through trains between London and Germany. Direct trains between St Pancras and Cologne could have started before the 2012 Olympics, with plans to run a regular service of three daily trains each direction to Frankfurt, Rotterdam and Amsterdam via Brussels in 2013. Deutsche Bahn trains would be made up of two coupled sets between London and Brussels, dividing at Bruxelles-Midi/Brussel-Zuid. DB showcased an ICE 3 trainset in St Pancras in October 2010. The start date for these services was not expected before 2018. In March 2017 it was announced that Deutsche Bahn had revived plans for a London to Frankfurt train service taking 5 hours, with the service beginning as early as 2020, though plans were later shelved.

In February 2010, the idea of a Transmanche Metro service gained support as local councillors in Kent and Pas-de-Calais announced that they were in talks to establish a high-frequency stopping service between London and Lille. Trains would start at Lille Europe and call at Calais, Ashford International and Stratford International before reaching St Pancras. Since High Speed 1 opened, Ashford and Calais have an infrequent service and Eurostar trains do not call at Stratford International. It was hoped the service would be running by 2012 in time for the London Olympics. The mayor of Calais revived these plans in 2016, and said it could be operational in five years.

London Underground station

King's Cross St Pancras Underground station serves both King's Cross and St Pancras main-line stations. It is in fare zone 1. The station has two ticket halls, both of which can be accessed directly from the St Pancras concourse. The tube station is served by more lines than any other station on the London Underground. In , King's Cross St Pancras was the  station on the system, with  million passengers entering and exiting the station.

The Underground station pre-dates the mainline as part of the initial section of Metropolitan Railway project on 10 January 1863, which was the first section of the London Underground to open. A separate station for the Great Northern, Piccadilly and Brompton Railway (now the Piccadilly line) opened on 15 December 1906, with the City and South London Railway (now part of the Northern line) opening on 12 May 1907. The Metropolitan Railway platforms were moved to their current location in 1941.

The Victoria line platforms were opened on 1 December 1968. A major expansion to accommodate High Speed 1 at St. Pancras opened in November 2009.

A pedestrian subway was built during the CTRL refurbishments.  It runs under Pancras Road from the eastern entrance of the domestic concourse at St Pancras to the northern ticket hall of King's Cross St Pancras tube station (opened November 2009) and the concourse for King's Cross (opened March 2012).

Notes

References

Citations

Sources

Further reading

External links

Railway stations in the London Borough of Camden
Railway termini in London
Former Midland Railway stations
Railway stations in Great Britain opened in 1868
Network Rail managed stations
Railway stations served by East Midlands Railway
Railway stations in Great Britain served by Eurostar
Railway stations served by Southeastern
Railway stations served by Govia Thameslink Railway
DfT Category A stations 
DfT Category C1 stations 
1868 establishments in England
St Pancras, London
France–United Kingdom border crossings
UK railway stations with juxtaposed controls
Grade I listed buildings in the London Borough of Camden
Grade I listed railway stations
Clock towers in the United Kingdom
Brick buildings and structures
Iron and steel buildings
George Gilbert Scott buildings
Transport architecture in London
Gothic Revival architecture in London
London station group